That Time I Got Reincarnated as a Slime is a 2018 television anime series based on the light novel series written by Fuse. The series follows a man who is killed and reincarnated in another world as a slime named Rimuru. The series is animated by Eight Bit and directed by Yasuhito Kikuchi, with Atsushi Nakayama as assistant director, Kazuyuki Fudeyasu handling series composition, Ryouma Ebata designing the characters, and Takahiro Kishida providing monster designs. Elements Garden is composing the series' music. The series aired from October 2, 2018, to March 19, 2019, on Tokyo MX and other channels. The series is Simulcast by Crunchyroll with Funimation streaming an English dub as it airs. The series ran for 24 episodes. An original animation DVD was originally scheduled to be released on March 29, 2019, bundled with the 11th manga volume, but it was delayed to December 4, 2019, bundled with the 13th manga volume. A second original animation DVD released on July 9, 2019, bundled with the 12th manga volume. Three more original animation DVDs have been announced, with the third OAD being released on March 26, 2020, bundled with the 14th manga volume. The fourth OAD is being bundled with the 15th manga volume, which releases on July 9, 2020. The fifth OADs was bundled with 16th manga volume, which releases on November 27, 2020.

The first opening theme is "Nameless Story" performed by Takuma Terashima, while the first ending theme is "Another Colony" performed by True. The second opening theme is  performed by Terashima, while the second ending theme is  performed by Azusa Tadokoro.


Episode list

International broadcast
The series is available with multilingual subtitles on iQIYI in South East Asia.

Notes

References

External links
 
That Time I Got Reincarnated as a Slime at Anime Streaming Search Engine

2018 Japanese television seasons
That Time I Got Reincarnated as a Slime episode lists